Ekambavanan is a 1947 Indian, Tamil-language film directed by B. N. Rao
and T. V. Krishnaswami. The film featured Kothamangalam Seenu and P. A. Periyanayaki in the lead roles.

Cast
Kothamangalam Seenu
K. Sarangapani
S. V. Subbaiah
Nagarcoil K. Mahadevan
P. A. Periyanayaki
C. T. Rajakantham
Baby Kamala

Production
P. A. Periyanayaki featured as heroine for the first time in this film.

Soundtrack
Music was composed by G. Ramanathan while the lyrics were penned by Papanasam Sivan and T. K. Sundara Vathiyar. Kothamangalam Seenu and P. A. Periyanayagi sang the songs.

References

External links

Indian black-and-white films
1940s Tamil-language films
Films scored by G. Ramanathan